Geraldine Brophy (born 1961) is a New Zealand television, film and stage actress, theatre director and playwright.

Biography 
Brophy was born in Birmingham, England to Irish parents. She and her family emigrated to New Zealand in 1972, when she was 12 years old. She attended Sacred Heart College in Lower Hutt. She left school when she was 16 years old, and received her first professional acting role in 1983, at the Centrepoint Theatre in Palmerston North. The following year she joined the Fortune Theatre company in Dunedin, and for ten years she was a core member of the Court Theatre company in Christchurch. She has also appeared for Downstage Theatre and Circa Theatre in Wellington and Auckland Theatre Company. In 2002, Brophy played the title role in the New Zealand Actors' Company production of Shakespeare's King Lear, Leah.

Brophy's first film appearance was in Fiona Samuel's film Home Movie in 1997, for which she won the New Zealand Film and Television Best Actress Award. After this role she was cast as the receptionist, Moira Crombie, in television soap opera Shortland Street, and played the character for 4 years. In the 2000s Brophy appeared in television and film productions, including a season of Dancing with the Stars, during which she was injured and required surgery.

In 2003 Brophy began writing plays. Her first play was The Viagra Monologues, followed in 2004 by Mary’s Gospel and Confessions of a Chocoholic. She has also written Real Estate, The Paradise Package and The Merry Wives of Windsor Avenue, which was commissioned by Downstage and Centrepoint Theatres in 2008. Brophy and her daughter Beatrice Joblin co-wrote Ladies A Plate.

Brophy has also directed plays on stage. In 2007, she directed Finding Murdoch for Downstage Theatre, Doubt for the Court Theatre, and Wednesday To Come. The following year she directed Under Milk Wood for the Court Theatre.

Screenography

Film

Television

Awards and recognition

Personal life 
Brophy is married to actor Ross Joblin and has two daughters. Their daughter Beatrice Joblin is a writer, director and producer.

References

External links 

 

Living people
English emigrants to New Zealand
People from Birmingham, West Midlands
New Zealand film actresses
New Zealand television actresses
New Zealand stage actresses
1961 births
21st-century New Zealand dramatists and playwrights
People educated at Sacred Heart College, Lower Hutt